Acacia carnosula is a shrub belonging to the genus Acacia and the subgenus Phyllodineae that is endemic to an area along the south coast of Western Australia. 

It has glabrous branchlets that have a rough surface of bark shedding into irregular flakes. The simple inflorescences occur singly or as pairs per axil. The linear seed pods that form after flowering are slightly constricted between the seeds. It blooms from July to October and produces yellow flowers.

It is native to an area along the south coast of the Goldfields-Esperance region of Western Australia east of Cape Arid into the western parts of the Nullarbor Plain, where it is found on dunes and limestone rises growing in sandy to clay-loamy soils. The range is mostly between Caiguna and Cocklebiddy, with one population near Israelite Bay.

See also
 List of Acacia species

References

carnosula
Acacias of Western Australia
Plants described in 1999
Taxa named by Bruce Maslin